Applecross is a riverside suburb of Perth, Western Australia, bounded by Canning Highway and the Swan River.  It is located within the City of Melville.

Name and early history
The suburb of Applecross takes its name from the Applecross peninsula in Wester Ross, Highland, on the northwest coast of Scotland. Many of the streets in the suburb have names from the area, including Carron, Gairloch, Ullapool, Kintail, Strome, Ardross, Alness, Kishorn, Glenelg, Duncraig, Dunvegan, Killilan and Roskhill.

The suburb of Applecross was originally assigned to Lionel Lukin on 28 May 1830. The land was finally acquired by Alexander Matheson, second son of Sir Alexander Matheson, 1st Baronet of Lochalsh, in February 1896. Matheson formed the Western Australian Investment Company Limited and instigated and named the subdivision of the area.

A distinguishing feature of the suburb are the jacaranda trees that line its streets and flower in the late spring. In keeping with this theme, Applecross is home to an annual Jacaranda festival in late November.

World War II
In 1940, the suburb was the location of a "Patriotic Grand Prix", a once only usage of the streets of the suburb for a car race known at the time as a "Round-the-houses" race.

Landmarks
A number of well known landmarks and facilities are in Applecross.  These include:
 Raffles Hotel and apartments at Coffee Point
 South of Perth Yacht Club
 The former Heathcote Hospitalused for mental health services from 1929 to 1994.  Now used as a community recreation facility. Point Heathcote was named after Midshipman George Gage Heathcote.  Captain James Stirling landed at the location in his 1827 expedition up the Swan River, and the site was considered by Stirling as an alternative to the Perth site when establishing the Swan River Colony in 1829.
 Waylen Bay
 Canning Bridge

Notable residents 
 Joel Creasey, comedian
 Adele Horin (1951-2015), journalist
 Glen Jakovich, West Coast Eagles footballer
 Shaun Marsh, cricketer
 Josephine Langford, actress
 Katherine Langford, actress 
 Heath Ledger (1979-2008), actor
 Pogo, electronic musician

Photos of the suburb

References

External links

 
Suburbs of Perth, Western Australia
Suburbs in the City of Melville